"Cry for You" is a song by American R&B group Jodeci recorded for their second album, Diary of a Mad Band (1993). The song was released as the album's lead single in November 1993. It peaked at number fifteen on the US Billboard Hot 100 chart and also spent four weeks at number one on the R&B/Hip-Hop songs chart (the last of five Jodeci songs to hit number one on that chart), and number one Mainstream R&B/Hip-Hop airplay chart. The song was certified Gold by the Recording Industry Association of America for sales in excess of 500,000 units.

Critical reception
Alan Jones from Music Week gave the song three out of five, writing, "An excellent dead slow, soul drenched ballad in much the same style as that purveyed by Boyz II Men. So slow, even in remixes, that club support is minimal, but specialist radio will love it."

Track listings
 US promo CD single
"Cry for You" (Extended Version) - 4:58
"Cry for You" (Radio Version) - 4:27
"Cry for You" (Instrumental) - 4:27
"Cry for You" (Acapella) - 4:58

 US promo Vinyl and 12"
"Cry for You" (Radio Version) - 4:27
"Cry for You" (Extended Version) - 4:27
"Cry for You" (Acapella) - 4:28

Personnel
Information taken from Discogs.
Co-Executive Producer: Buttnaked Tim Dawg
Executive Producer: Andre Harrell
Instruments: DeVante Swing
Lyrics: DeVante Swing
Producer: DeVante Swing
Cedric "K-Ci" Hailey - Lead and Background vocals
Joel "JoJo" Hailey - Lead and Background vocals
DeVante Swing - Background vocals
Mr. Dalvin - Background vocals

Charts

Weekly charts

Year-end charts

Certifications

Cover and sample versions
The song was later sampled by hip hop artist Bun B for his 2008 single "You're Everything."

The song was covered by J Valentine, Tank, Bobby Cash, & T. Nelson under the title "Cry 4 U". The song is available on the J Valentine mixtape "Love & Other Drugs".

The Isley Brothers interpolated the song on the cover version of the track "Warm Summer Night" from the 2001 album, Eternal.

Drake mentions the song in the chorus of his 2016 single, "Controlla".

Gerald Levert re-sung the song on the track "Hang in There" from his 2007 posthumous album, In My Songs.

See also
List of number-one R&B singles of 1994 (U.S.)

References

1993 singles
Jodeci songs
Song recordings produced by DeVante Swing
Songs written by DeVante Swing
1993 songs
Uptown Records singles
MCA Records singles
Contemporary R&B ballads
Soul ballads
1990s ballads